Nones may refer to:

Nones (Auden), a 1951 book of poems by W. H. Auden
Nones (Berio), a 1954 orchestral composition by Luciano Berio
Nones (calendar), or Nonae, days of the Roman Calendar
None (liturgy), the ninth hour of the traditional Christian liturgy
Nones dialect, spoken in northern Italy
Nones, a term sometimes used for people with no religious affiliation in the United States

See also
None (disambiguation)